Orchard Lake is a 795-acre lake located in Oakland County in the U.S. state of Michigan. The lake is within the city of Orchard Lake Village.  It has a  maximum depth.  Orchard Lake is the second-largest lake and third-deepest lake in Oakland County.

The lake has a 35-acre island in the middle of it, Apple Island. The island was frequently inhabited by local Native Americans before the coming of Western settlers, who later planted an apple orchard on the island, giving rise to the current name of the lake. Apple Island is now abandoned and has been designated a protected wildlife sanctuary. Once a year the island is circumnavigated by runners of Team CG across the lake’s frozen surface. Another island, Cedar Island, is near the lake's western shore.

The campus of the old Michigan Military Academy is on the northeast shore of the lake. The campus is now home to SS. Cyril and Methodius Seminary and St. Mary's Preparatory.

See also
List of lakes in Oakland County, Michigan

References

External links
 

Lakes of Oakland County, Michigan